The following lists events that happened during 1926 in the Union of Soviet Socialist Republics.

Incumbents
 General Secretary of the Communist Party of the Soviet Union – Joseph Stalin
 Chairman of the Central Executive Committee of the Congress of Soviets – Mikhail Kalinin
 Chairman of the Council of People's Commissars of the Soviet Union – Alexei Rykov

Events

January 

 29 January – Soviet law changes and the size of inheritable estates becomes effectively unlimited.

April
 24 April – The Treaty of Berlin (1926) is signed.

July

 July – The "Declaration of the 13" was written by Kamenev, Krupskaya, Trotsky, Zinoviev, along with 9 other contributors. The declaration was a denouncement of the economic policies of the right and the attacks on freedom the writers felt would lead to the destruction of the Bolshevik Revolution.

December

 December – The First All-Union Census of the Soviet Union is conducted.

Births
 11 January – Lev Dyomin, cosmonaut
 20 January – Vitaly Vorotnikov, statesman
 31 January – Lev Russov, painter
 7 February
 Konstantin Feoktistov, cosmonaut
 Mark Taimanov, pianist
 10 March – Ivan Filin, Olympic athlete
 24 March – Engels Kozlov, painter
 3 April – Valentin Falin, diplomat and politician (died 2018)
 10 April – Valeria Larina, painter
 26 April – Yefrem Sokolov, politician (died in 2022)
 22 May – Mikhail Bychkov, ice hockey player
 1 June – Aleksandr Anufriyev, Olympic athlete
 23 September – Valentin Kuzin, ice hockey player
 25 September – Sergei Filatov, Olympic equestrian
 8 October – Andrey Yevgenyevich Lichko, psychiatrist
 20 October – Gennadi Kryuchkov, Russian Baptist minister
 10 December – Nikolai Tishchenko, footballer

Deaths
 24 November – Leonid Krasin, politician (born 1870)

See also
 List of Soviet films of 1926
 1926 in fine arts of the Soviet Union

References

 
1920s in the Soviet Union
Years in the Soviet Union
Soviet Union
Soviet Union
Soviet Union